UL Bend National Wildlife Refuge is  a  protected area that is located in central Montana, United States. The refuge, located at the extreme southernmost tip of Phillips County, is managed and bordered on three sides by the Charles M. Russell National Wildlife Refuge and the Fort Peck Reservoir on the Missouri River. The refuge is an integral part of the Charles M. Russell National Wildlife Refuge Complex. The UL Bend Wilderness comprises almost half the refuge and provides a high level of protection to the most remote regions.

Fauna
A large species population of red fox, bald eagle, bighorn sheep, golden eagle, black bear, great horned owl, moose, burrowing owl, coyote, elk, swift fox, bobcat, pronghorn, mule deer, and cougar inhabit this refuge. Prairie dogs are abundant and are the primary food source for the black-footed ferret, which is listed as an endangered species. The Black-footed ferret has been reintroduced into the refuge after nearing extinction yet the sustainability of this relocated species is not yet known, and there are only 1,000 remaining in breeding compounds and perhaps 100 in the wild. Researchers in 2002 were only able to locate a total of 5 ferrets in the entire refuge.

A proposal for the reintroduction of bison was submitted.

Access
This refuge is remote, requiring travel by gravel and dirt roads that can be difficult to navigate during inclement weather.

Management
The refuge is managed by the U.S. Fish and Wildlife Service, an agency of the U.S. Department of the Interior. UL Bend Wilderness is  a  wilderness area within the refuge that was established in 1976 to provide a higher level of protection to the more remote sections.

References

External links
 
 

National Wildlife Refuges in Montana
Protected areas of Phillips County, Montana